Ian Thomas Wayne Dunn (born 11 June 1960) is a former New Zealand rugby union player. A first five-eighth, Dunn represented North Auckland at a provincial level, and was a member of the New Zealand national side, the All Blacks, in 1983 and 1984. He played 13 matches for the All Blacks including three internationals.

References

1960 births
Living people
People from Te Kōpuru
New Zealand rugby union players
New Zealand international rugby union players
Northland rugby union players
Māori All Blacks players
Rugby union fly-halves
People educated at Dargaville High School
Rugby union players from the Northland Region